NGC 7816 is a spiral galaxy located about 215 million light-years away in the constellation of Pisces. It was discovered by astronomer William Herschel on September 26, 1785.

Pair with NGC 7818
NGC 7816 is listed as being in pair with the galaxy NGC 7818. NGC 7818 is also listed as being a disturbed member of the pair. However, due to the large difference in their recessional velocities, the two galaxies are not a true pair but an optical double.

See also 
 List of NGC objects (7001–7840)

References

External links 

Spiral galaxies
Pisces (constellation)
7816
+1-1-18
00263
00016
Astronomical objects discovered in 1785